Michael Fitzgerald Alexander (born March 19, 1965) is a former professional gridiron football player who played for the Los Angeles Raiders and Buffalo Bills of the National Football League (NFL). After his career in the NFL, he went on to play for the Baltimore Stallions of the Canadian Football League. Alexander played collegiately at Penn State University and attended Piscataway Township High School in Piscataway, New Jersey.

Professional career 

Alexander was the 8th round draft pick (#199 overall) of the Los Angeles Raiders in the 1988 NFL Draft. He debuted for the Raiders in 1989. Alexander became a free agent after the 1989 season and resigned with the Raiders. He was released as part of the team's final cuts in 1991. Alexander played with the Buffalo Bills in 1991.

From 1992 to 1994, Alexander was signed by several NFL teams but didn't play in any regular season games. He returned to the Raiders for training camp in 1992 but was released before the regular season. In 1993, Alexander attended training camp with the San Francisco 49ers. He briefly signed with the Calgary Stampeders of the CFL before returning to the Los Angeles Raiders for the summer of 1994.

From 1994 to 1995, Alexander played ten games for the short-lived Baltimore Stallions of the CFL. He recorded four tackles on special teams and caught three passes for 71 yards and a touchdown. He was released from the Stallions in July 1995.

References

1965 births
Living people
Sportspeople from Manhattan
Players of American football from New York City
People from Piscataway, New Jersey
Piscataway High School alumni
Sportspeople from Middlesex County, New Jersey
American football wide receivers
Penn State Nittany Lions football players
Los Angeles Raiders players
Buffalo Bills players